Dawn Aerospace is a space company based in the United States of America, the Netherlands and New Zealand. The company currently manufactures satellite propulsion systems with lower greenhouse potential and nontoxic materials, as well as an unmanned suborbital spaceplanes with rapidly reusable flight characteristics.

History 
Dawn Aerospace was co-founded in 2016 by New Zealand brothers, Stefan Powell and James Powell, as well as Jeroen Wink (from the Netherlands), with Tobias Knop with Robert Werner (both from Germany). 

In 2018, Dawn Aerospace raised $3.5m in seed funding from New Zealand, American and Dutch investors. Further investment of an undisclosed figure was made in 2021 by Movac and others.

In 2020, Dawn Aerospace successfully performed atmospheric testing of their Dawn MK II spaceplane, verifying its flight characteristics before future 2023 testing of a larger platform.

Satellite Propulsion Hardware 
Dawn Aerospace currently produces hardware for Small satellites, to include thrusters and propellants.

Dawn areospace has provided the propellant to Pixxel, an Indian based space organization.
They also have signed contracts with the ESA,
contracts with Blue Canyon, now part of Raytheon, to provide its propriarty mix of proallents for microsatelite operations and ALE Co., Ltd. Japan and UARX Space. In the last case Dawn provided them with its own proprietary propulsion architecture.
Dawn Aerospace has also signed contracts with Indonesia's national space agency, working to provide the propellant for a new satellite network dedicated to providing early warning of tsunami and earthquake related phenomena.

B20 Thruster 

Dawn Aerospace’s B20 thruster is a 20 newton thruster that uses a chemical propellant made up of nitrous oxide and propylene. The innovation is that it replaces hydrazine, a highly toxic chemical compound often used in satellites. This allows for quicker launches and more safe handling of the rocket while on the ground, increasing launch cadence. In 2021,  D-Orbit, a space logicists firm, validated the thrusters on its PULSE space tug mission, firing six B20 thrusters.

B1 thruster 
Another in-space propulsion rocket motor, the B1 thruster is a 1 newton thruster for satellites. It is manufactured as a single structure using Inconel 718. In 2021 it was flown on the Hiber-Three and Hiber-Four 3U CubeSat, which were respectively launched by Soyuz-2 and Falcon9 on the SpaceX Transporter-1 mission, SpaceX's first dedicated SmallSat Rideshare program mission.

Dawn Mk-II Aurora spaceplane 
Dawn Aerospace unveiled  the Mk-II Aurora unmanned suborbital spaceplane in July 2020. With 100 per cent hardware recovery and same-day flight capabilities, the Mk-II Aurora is a reusable vehicle that has demonstrated more than 48 flights. In 2021, the Mk-II Aurora flew for the first time during five test flights over the South Island of New Zealand between July 28 and July 30.

On 9 December 2021, Dawn Aerospace announced it had received a license to fly it's suborbital spaceplane from a conventional New Zealand Airport, working with the Civil Aviation Authority of New Zealand and New Zealand Space Agency.

Dawn Aerospace has conducted 48 successful tests using jet engines to prove their spaceplane platform.  , verifying its flight characteristics before future 2023 testing of a larger platform.

Facilities 
Dawn Aerospace operates from three global bases:  one in the Netherlands, one in New Zealand, and finally one in the United States of America.  Dawn Aerospace’s headquarters are in Christchurch, New Zealand. They placed it there due to it being a good location for flight testing with less air traffic and stable weather. Dawn Aerospace is registered in New Zealand.

References 

Aerospace companies of New Zealand